Stuff is the debut studio disc by the group Stuff, a team of renowned session musicians.  Released in 1976 on Warner Bros., it was produced by Herb Lovelle and jazz producer Tommy LiPuma. The record earned RIAA gold status, and the group would go on to record two more studio discs, each of which also went gold.

Track listing
"Foots" (Richard Tee, Cornell Dupree, Eric Gale, Gordon Edwards, Steve Gadd, Chris Parker) 3:58
"My Sweetness" (Tee) 3:21
"(Do You) Want Some of This?" (Tee) 4:20
"Looking for the Juice" (Tee, Edwards) 3:52
"Reflections of Divine Love" (J.C. White) 5:00
"How Long Will It Last" (Gale) 4:15
"Sun Song" (Leon Thomas) 4:24
"Happy Farms" (Dupree) 3:54
"Dixie/Up on the Roof" (Traditional/Gerry Goffin, Carole King) 6:33

Personnel
Stuff
Richard Tee - Hammond B-3 organ, acoustic and electric pianos 
Cornell Dupree - acoustic and electric guitars
Eric Gale - acoustic and electric guitars
Gordon Edwards - bass, percussion
Chris Parker, Steve Gadd - drums, percussion

Production
Arranged by Stuff
Produced by Herb Lovelle (for Goryan Productions) & Tommy LiPuma (for Just Sunshine Records)
Recording Engineers: Al Schmitt, Gil Markle & Jesse Henderson
Mixed by Gil Markle
Mastered by George Marino
Tracks 2 & 3 published by Coffin Music. 
Track 1 published by Stuff by Stuff Music.
Track 4 published by Yangor Music/Coffin Music.
Track 5 published by Jayglow Music/Kwan Music/Savar Music.
Track 6 published by Antisia Music, Inc.
Track 7 published by Nuwaupu Music.
Track 8 published by Corerm Music.
Track 9 published by Public Domain/Screen Gems-EMI Music.

References

External links
Stuff at Discogs

1976 debut albums
Albums produced by Tommy LiPuma
Warner Records albums